Malaya Areshevka is a rural locality (a selo) and the administrative centre of Maloareshevsky Selsoviet, Kizlyarsky District, Republic of Dagestan, Russia. The population was 1,668 as of 2010. There are 8 streets.

Geography 
Malaya Areshevka is located 23 km northeast of Kizlyar (the district's administrative centre) by road. Kerlikent and Serebryakovka are the nearest rural localities.

Nationalities 
Avars, Dargins and Russians live there.

References 

Rural localities in Kizlyarsky District